The Electricity Act 1947 (10 & 11 Geo. 6. c. 54.) was an Act of the Parliament of the United Kingdom which nationalised, or bought into state control, the electricity supply industry in Great Britain.  It established a central authority called the British Electricity Authority (BEA) to own and operate all public electricity generation and transmission facilities and created 14 area electricity boards with a duty to acquire bulk supplies of electricity from the central authority and to distribute and sell electricity economically and efficiently to industrial, commercial and domestic consumers. It vested 505 separate local authority and company owned electricity undertakings in the BEA with effect from 1 April 1948. The Electricity Act 1947 is one of a number of Acts promulgated by the post-war Labour government to nationalise elements of the UK’s industrial infrastructure; other Acts include the Coal Industry Nationalisation Act 1946; Transport Act 1947 (railways and long-distance road haulage); Gas Act 1948; and Iron and Steel Act 1949.

Background 
The issues of fragmentation, inefficiency and complexity of the British electricity supply industry had long been recognised. The Electricity (Supply) Acts 1919 and 1926 had attempted to provide central coordination and control of operations, through the creation of the Electricity Commissioners and the Central Electricity Board respectively, but with only partial effectiveness. In 1935 the government appointed a committee to examine electricity distribution under the chairmanship of Sir Harry McGowan. The subsequent report recommended that new legislation should aim to give compulsory powers for larger and more efficient electricity undertakings to absorb smaller and less efficient ones. New schemes should be prepared with a view to public ownership of all undertakings. A start was made in 1937 by the Electricity Commissioners to prepare schemes for districts to be consolidated into groups. These plans were not implemented before the war.

The Labour leader of the London County Council, Herbert Morrison, made a speech in the House of Commons in 1936 proposing that the 600-odd electricity undertakings together with the Central Electricity Board and the Electricity Commissioners should be abolished and ownership of the industry should be vested in a National Electricity Corporation.

During the Second World War the Ministry of Fuel and Power was formed in June 1942 to coordinate and assume control (from the Board of Trade) of the production and supply of electricity, coal, gas and other fuels under war-time conditions. One of its first roles was to establish a Joint Committee of Electricity Supply Organisations to make recommendations on the future constitution, control and management of electricity supply. Several proposals were put forward:

 The London and Home Counties Joint Electricity Authority proposed that the 75 electricity undertakings within its area should be absorbed into a London Electricity Board.
 The Electrical Power Engineers Association proposed a public service National Electricity Supply Board to take over the roles of the Central Electricity Board, generating stations and distribution networks.
 The Incorporated Municipal Electrical Association recommended that power stations should be owned by the Central Electricity Board and that local authorities should be responsible for distribution  of electricity.

A reconstruction sub-committee of the Coalition Government, chaired by the Minister of Fuel and Power reported in 1943 on the future of the supply industry. The committee noted that the split between ownership and control of generation had ‘inevitably involved many complications, some financial and some practical’. The Central Electricity Board had limited control over the design of power station plant, and there were tensions between commercial expediency and the national interest. The committee recommended ‘centralising in the hands of a single generating authority the ownership, and not merely the control, of the stations generating for public supply’. The recommendations formed the basis of the structure of the industry taken forward in the Electricity Act 1947.

The Electricity Act 1947 
The Electricity Act 1947 received Royal Assent on 13 August 1947. Its long title is: 'An Act to provide for the establishment of a British Electricity Authority and Area Electricity Boards and for the exercise and performance by that Authority and those Boards and the North of Scotland Hydro-Electric Board of functions relating to the supply of electricity and certain other matters ; for the transfer to the said Authority or any such Board as aforesaid of property, rights, obligations and liabilities of electricity undertakers and other bodies ; to amend the law relating to the supply of electricity ; to make certain consequential provision as to income tax ; and for purposes connected with the matters aforesaid'.

Provisions 
The provisions of the act comprise 69 sections in four parts, plus five schedules

 Part I British Electricity Authority and area electricity boards
 Sections 1 to 12 – including the constitution of the central authority and the electricity boards; functions of the electricity boards; powers of the minister, the central authority and electricity boards; consultative councils.
 Part II Acquisition of electricity undertakings
 Vesting of Assets – Sections 13 to 19 – including bodies to whom Part II applies; undertakings of local authorities; composite companies; transfer of property
 Compensation to Holders of Securities – Sections 20 and 21
 Compensation to local authorities – Sections 22 to 24
 Compensation to Composite Companies – Section 25
 Control of Dividends and Interest and Safeguarding of Assets pending transfer – Sections 26 to 30 – including control of dividends and interest; income tax
 Supplementary Provisions – Sections 31 to 35 – including Arbitration tribunal; enforcement
 Part III Financial provisions
 Sections 36 to 47 – including duties ad powers of central authority and Area Boards; tariffs; borrowing powers; British Electricity Stock; Treasury guarantees; accounts and audits.
 Part IV Miscellaneous and general
 Non-statutory undertakings – Section 48 – acquisition
 Further provisions as to electricity supply – Sections 49 to 52 – railways; use of heat; certification of meters
 Conditions of Employment and Pension Rights – Sections 53 to 56
 Consequential amendment of Statutory Provisions – Sections 57 to 59 – amendment and repeal of enactments; power to dissolve Electricity Commissioners
 General – Sections 60 to 69 – making regulations; penalties; notices; inquiries; application to Scotland
 Five schedules – including lists of undertakings; enactments amended and repealed.

Later enactments 
Subsequently, the South of Scotland Electricity Board (SSEB), was formed by the merger of the South West Scotland Electricity Board and South East Scotland Electricity Board  under the provisions of the Electricity Reorganisation (Scotland) Act 1954. The functions of the Minister of Power in respect of electricity supply in Scotland were transferred to the Secretary of State for Scotland. The Act  also made provision for the title of the British Electricity Authority to be changed to the Central Electricity Authority. All these provisions of the 1954 Act came  into effect on 1 April 1955.

The Electricity Act 1957 dissolved the Central Electricity Authority and replaced it with two new statutory bodies, the Electricity Council and the Central Electricity Generating Board (CEGB).

The 1947 Act and most other related British legislation were repealed and replaced by the Electricity Act 1989.

See also 
 List of pre-nationalisation UK electric power companies
 Electricity (Supply) Act 1919
 Electricity (Supply) Act 1922
 Electricity (Supply) Act 1926
 Electricity (Supply) Act 1935
 Electricity Act 1957
 Electricity Act 1989
 British Electricity Authority
 Utilities Act 2000
 Distribution network operator
 Northern Ireland Electricity

References

External links

Original text of the Act as enacted in 1947, from the Office of Public Sector Information

United Kingdom Acts of Parliament 1947
Former nationalised industries of the United Kingdom
Electric power in the United Kingdom
Nationalisation in the United Kingdom